Marino Institute of Education is an Irish College of Education, an associated College of Trinity College Dublin. It is located on Griffith Avenue, Dublin 9. Marino Institute of Education is focused on providing education courses. Its degrees and diplomas are awarded by the University of Dublin, Trinity College. Marino Institute of Education follows the tradition of care through education established by Edmund Rice. Marino Institute of Education comprises the College of Education, the Conference Centre, Continuing Professional Development (CPD) and various support services.

History
In 1831, the residence of the Superior General of the Irish Christian Brothers and the centre of teacher training was moved to North Richmond Street (O’Connell Schools) Dublin from Our Lady's Mount (North Monastery) in Cork. In 1874, the residence of the Superior General of the Irish Christian Brothers was transferred to Belvedere House in Drumcondra now the President's House in St Patrick's College of Education. In 1881, the Congregation moved to Marino House, on the original Lord Charlemont demesne. In 1900, the foundation stone was laid for a new Generalate, called St Mary's, and this is still the main building on the college campus today. St Mary's building was completed, and opened, in 1905.

The college trained Christian Brothers who taught throughout the world, on all five continents. In 1926, the Congregation became involved in the Irish National School system, and consequentially the college's focus on primary education increased.

In 1929, the Department of Education recognised the college as a teacher training college and students were awarded a National Teachers' Diploma (NT) on completion of their course.

In 1971, Brothers of other orders such as the De La Salle, and Marist Brothers, began to attend the college. From 1972, lay students were admitted to Marino Institute of Education. The B.Ed qualification gained from Marino Institute of Education was validated by Trinity College Dublin.

In 2006, Dr. Anne O'Gara was appointed President of Marino Institute of Education.

2012 saw Trinity College Dublin join the Christian Brothers in Co-Trusteeship of Marino Institute of Education.

In May 2018, Dr. Teresa O'Doherty was appointed President

Courses
There are numerous courses on offer at Marino Institute of Education. These include:
Undergraduate Degrees:
 Bachelor in Education (Primary Teaching)
 Bachelor in Science (Education Studies)
 Bachelor in Science (Early Childhood Education)
Post-Graduate Diplomas:
 Professional Diploma in Education (Further Education)
Master's degrees:
 Professional Master of Education (Primary Teaching)(PME)
 Master in Education Studies (Intercultural Education)
 Master in Education Studies (Early Childhood Education)
 Master in Education Studies (Leadership in Christian Education)
 Master in Education Studies (Inquiry-Based Learning)
 Master in Education Studies (Visual Arts)
Other
 Trinity International Foundation Programme (IFP)
 Adult Education Certificate in Spirituality and Human Development

Other activities 
The Irish language is encouraged and fostered in the college.

Marino Institute of Education has extensive conferencing facilities, which are used to host functions and events for a variety of educational, academic, religious, and other corporate organisations.

Marino Institute of Education has hosted a variety of seminars and summer schools such as International Summer School in Irish Studies in association with Trinity and Iona College (New York).

Marino Institute of Education students participate in many sports, with individuals and teams playing Gaelic football, Hurling, Camogie, Basketball, Badminton, and Athletics. Facilities such as the college gym and playing fields are available to students. There are also a number of non-sporting student societies such as traditional music, debating, drama, dance and film clubs.

Marino Institute of Education provides a Study Abroad Programme with Iona College New York.

Marino Institute of Education runs Continuing Professional Development (CPD) courses for national school teachers during the summer, both on-site and on-line. These are run in conjunction with the INTO (Irish National Teachers' Organisation) and are well attended, every year.

Notable alumni
John Allen (born 1955) - hurler and Gaelic footballer
Gerry Breen (born 1957) - Fine Gael politician
Sinéad Burke (born 1990) - writer, academic and disability activist 
Marty O'Reilly (born 1993) - hurler and Gaelic footballer
Aodhán Ó Ríordáin (born 1976) - Labour Party politician
Róisín Shortall (born 1954) - Social Democrats politician
Tadhg Morley (born 1993) - All-Ireland winner with Kerry

References

External links

MIE Conference Centre

Catholic universities and colleges in the Republic of Ireland
Trinity College Dublin
Education schools in Ireland
Universities and colleges in the Republic of Ireland